The 2008 Kent State Golden Flashes football team represented the Kent State University during the 2008 NCAA Division I FBS football season. Kent State competed as a member of the Mid-American Conference (MAC), and played their home games at Dix Stadium. The Golden Flashes were led by fifth-year head coach Doug Martin. Kent State finished the season with a 4–8 record (MAC: 3–5).

Kent State lost to Boston College of the Atlantic Coast Conference in the season-opener, the second-annual FirstMerit Patriot Bowl, 21–0. Against Iowa State of the Big 12, the Golden Flashes suffered two blocked punts and surrendered four fumbles in a 48–28 loss. They beat Division I FCS opponent, Delaware State, handily, 24–3. Without their featured running back, Eugene Jarvis, they also lost to Louisiana–Lafayette, undefeated Ball State, and Akron. Against the latter, Kent State led 21–10 at half time, but missed a 27-yard field goal in the fourth quarter and surrendered a touchdown, which forced overtime. In second overtime, the Flashes lost by missing a 23-yard field goal. In the season finale, they upset eventual MAC champions, Buffalo, 24–21.

Schedule

References

Kent State
Kent State Golden Flashes football seasons
Kent State Golden Flashes football